Ludwigite  is a magnesium-iron borate mineral: Mg2FeBO5.

Ludwigite typically occurs in magnesian iron skarn and other high temperature contact metamorphic deposits. It occurs in association with magnetite, forsterite, clinohumite and the borates vonsenite and szaibelyite. It forms a solid solution series with the iron(II)-iron(III) borate mineral vonsenite.

It was first described in 1874 for an occurrence in Ocna de Fier, Banat Mountains, Caraș-Severin County, Romania and named for Ernst Ludwig (1842–1915), an Austrian chemist at the University of Vienna.

References

Magnesium minerals
Iron(III) minerals
Borate minerals
Orthorhombic minerals
Minerals in space group 55